The Pioneer Sod House in Wheat Ridge, Colorado is a sod house built in 1886 or perhaps well before.  It was listed on the National Register of Historic Places in 1973.

Sod houses were rare in the Denver area, as lumber was available, and this is likely the only one surviving.  It was more or less continuously occupied as a residence from 1886 to the summer of 1972.

While the 1973 National Register nomination asserted it was built in 1886, the house is believed by the Wheat Ridge Historical Society to have been built in 1864 or before 1859.

See also
National Register of Historic Places listings in Jefferson County, Colorado

References

Houses on the National Register of Historic Places in Colorado
Houses completed in 1886
Houses in Jefferson County, Colorado
Sod houses
National Register of Historic Places in Jefferson County, Colorado
Museums in Jefferson County, Colorado